The 1986 UCF Knights football season was the eighth season for the team. It was Gene McDowell's second season as the head coach of the Knights. McDowell's 1986 team compiled a 6–5 overall record.

The Knights competed as an NCAA Division II Independent. The team played their home games at the Citrus Bowl in Downtown Orlando. The Knights nearly earned their first-ever victory against a Division I-A team. On October 11, they fell 9-6 at Wichita State, on a miserable, soggy, afternoon after missing an extra point and two botched field goal attempts. It proved to be the Shockers' final football victory; less than two months after the game, Wichita State announced it was disbanding its program.

Schedule

References

UCF
UCF Knights football seasons
UCF Knights football